There were four special elections to the United States House of Representatives in 1915:

|-
! 
| Joseph T. Johnson
| 
| 1900
|  | Incumbent resigned April 19, 1915 to become judge of the U.S. District Court for the Western District of South Carolina.New member elected September 14, 1915.Democratic hold.
| nowrap | 

|-
! 
| Joseph A. Goulden
| 
| 1912
|  | Incumbent died May 3, 1915.New member elected November 2, 1915.Republican gain.
| nowrap | 

|-
! 
| Edwin A. Merritt
| 
| 1912 
|  | Incumbent died December 4, 1914.New member elected November 2, 1915.Republican hold.
| nowrap | 

|-
! 
| Sereno E. Payne
| 
| 1889 
|  | Incumbent died December 10, 1914.New member elected November 2, 1915.Republican hold.
| nowrap | 

|-
! 
| colspan=3 | Vacant
|  | Rep.-elect William M. Brown (R) died January 31, 1915.New member elected November 3, 1915.Republican hold.
| nowrap | 

|}

References 

 
1915